The Danish Handball Federation ( or DHF) is the national governing body for handball in Denmark. It is based in Brøndby.

History 
The DHF was founded on 2 June 1935. It is a member of the European Handball Federation and the International Handball Federation. Danish Handball Federation is the third largest in the world, only surpassed by German Handball Association and French Handball Federation.

Achievements
Denmark is the country with the most success and medals in the sport of Handball. With a total of 103 overall medals it makes them the strongest Handball Federation in the World.

Total Host
 25

Count
 : 42
 : 32
 : 32
Total : 104

Men's Olympic Championship
 : 2016
World Championship
 : 2019, 2021
 : 1967, 2011, 2013
 : 2007
World Outdoor Championship
 : 1948
Junior World Championship
 : 1997, 1999, 2005
 : 1993, 2003, 2009, 2011, 2015, 2017
 : 1983, 2007
Youth World Championship
 : 2007, 2011, 2013
 : 2017, 2019
European Championship
 : 2008, 2012
 : 2014
 : 2002, 2004, 2006
Junior European Championship
 : 1996, 1998, 2008, 2010
 : 2004
 : 2006
Youth European Championship
 : 2001, 2006, 2008
 : 1994, 1999, 2003, 2004, 2010, 2012, 2018
Men's European Open Championship
 : 2013
Men's EYOF Championship
 : 1997, 2011
 : 2009
European Men's Beach Handball Championship
 : 2019
 : 2013
Men's friendly TotalKredit Cup
 : 2012, 2014
Men's friendly Golden League
 : 2013
Women's Olympic Championship
 : 1996, 2000, 2004
Women's Youth Olympic Championship
 : 2010
World Women's Street Handball Championship
 : 1962
World Women's Championship
 : 1997
 : 1962, 1993
 : 1995, 2013
World Women's Junior Championship
 : 1997, 2016
 : 1987, 1995, 2008
 : 1991, 1999, 2014
World Women's Youth Championship
 : 2006, 2012
 : 2016
 : 2008, 2014
Women's World Beach Championship
 : 2010, 2012
Women's European Championship
 : 1994, 1996, 2002
 : 1998, 2004, 2022
Women's Junior European Championship
 : 1996, 2007, 2011, 2015
 : 2017
 : 2013
Women's Youth European Championship
 : 2005, 2009, 2015
 : 1992, 2011
 : 1994, 2013
Women's European Open Championship
 : 2006, 2010
 : 2014
Women's EYOF Championship
 : 1997, 1999, 2013
 : 2005, 2007, 2009, 2011
Women's Beach European Championship
 : 2019
 : 2011, 2013
Women's friendly Møbelringen Cup
 : 2005
 : 2010, 2012
 : 2007, 2008
Women's friendly GF World Cup
 : 2008
 : 2006, 2013

Competitions 
The Danish Handball Federation organises the national club leagues and the national teams (both senior and junior). In addition, the DHF organises international tournaments.

National 
 Danish Handball League
 Danish Women's Handball League
 Danish Handball Cup
 National handball team (women, men)

International 
 GF World Cup, an annual invitational tournament usually played in October

Competitions hosted

International
 1978 World Men's Handball Championship
 1979 Men's Junior World Handball Championship
 1987 Women's Junior World Handball Championship
 1999 World Women's Handball Championship
 2015 World Women's Handball Championship
 2019 World Men's Handball Championship
 2023 World Women's Handball Championship

Continental
 1996 European Women's Handball Championship
 2002 European Women's Handball Championship
 2010 European Women's Handball Championship
 2013 Women's Under-19 European Handball Championship
 2014 European Men's Handball Championship
 2016 European Men's Under-20 Handball Championship
 2020 European Women's Handball Championship

Coaching

Danish International Handball Coaches
  Men's National Handball Team Nikolaj Jacobsen
  Women's National Handball Team Jesper Jensen
  Men's National Handball Team Ingi Olsen
  Women's National Handball Team Johannes Groth
  Men's National Handball Team Sonni Larsen
  Women's National Handball Team Morten Soubak
  Women's National Handball Team Ulrik Kirkely
  Women's National Handball Team Martin Albertsen
  Women's National Handball Team Heine Jensen
  Women's National Handball Team Bo Milton Andersen
  Men's National Handball Team Jesper Houmark

External links 
 Official Site 

Handball in Denmark
Denmark
Handball
Sports organizations established in 1935
1935 establishments in Denmark